Indocoelacanthus robustus is a fossil sarcopterygian. The holotype specimen was found in Lower Jurassic-aged riverine sediment of the Kota formation, in the Pranhita-Godavari valley at Boraigudem limestone ridge, about 30 kilometers southeast of Sironcha, India. The holotype is preserved in the museum of the Indian Statistical Institute.

See also

 Sarcopterygii
 List of sarcopterygians
 List of prehistoric bony fish

References

Prehistoric lobe-finned fish genera
Early Jurassic fish
Fossils of India
Fossil taxa described in 1974